Levenger is a privately held specialty retail company owned by Steve and Lori Leveen. It was established in 1987 and as of November 2022, it was headquartered in Delray Beach, Florida. As of that date, it was led by its former chief marketing officer, now CEO, Margaret Moraskie. Levenger product components are “made under contract…  in China, Hong, Taiwan, Germany and India” with “much of [its product] assembly… done in the United States.” Levenger order fulfillment and customer service operations are in Memphis, Tennessee, and all its customer service is handled at the company headquarters.
 
Levenger’s products as of November 2022 include leather bags and briefbags, folios and other products to hold tablets and other personal electronics, fine writing instruments, and an extensive line of note-taking products, in particular its Circa® disc-binding notebooks. 

Levenger designs many of its products, with approximately 75% of its product line being proprietary.  The company describes itself as a champion of Slow Tech. One example of the mix of old and new technologies, or dual technologies, is the company’s Shirt Pocket Briefcase®, introduced in 1992.

Levenger CEO and co-founder Steve Leveen has aligned the company with the Conscious Capitalism movement. To that end, the company has created an initiative called Partnering for Good, which pays product-based royalties to nonprofit institutions whose missions are connected to reading or learning. Among these institutions are the Library of Congress, the New York Public Library, The Boston Public Library, the Bodleian Library of Oxford University, and The Morgan Library and Museum. The initiative also links specific products with contributions to literacy programs.

History
Levenger was established in 1987 by the Leveens, Steve Leveen and his wife, Lori Granger Leveen. The name “Levenger” was derived from their surnames, Leveen (Leve-) and Granger. Noticing a need for a good beside-the-bed reading lamp in their first home together in Belmont, Massachusetts, and aware of the up-and-coming halogen lighting technology, the Leveens placed an ad in The New Yorker magazine and began selling lamps, using their neighbor’s garage as the fulfillment center and their own spare bedroom as the main office. The first tagline was “Serious Lighting for Serious Readers.” Two months after running the ad, Levenger had 47 customers. The tagline later changed to “Tools for Serious Readers.”

By 1999, the company had grown to be a US$ 60M business. By 2004, an analysis of the business described it as having saturated its U.S. market, and being in need of further business innovation to allow it to continue to grow.

References

External links 
 Levenger
 Levenger Press

Retail companies established in 1987
Online retailers of the United States
Mail-order retailers
Companies based in Palm Beach County, Florida